

180001–180100 

|-bgcolor=#f2f2f2
| colspan=4 align=center | 
|}

180101–180200 

|-id=141
| 180141 Sperauskas ||  || Julius Sperauskas (born 1950), President of Lithuanian Astronomical Union (2003–2007), is a senior researcher at the Astronomical Observatory of Vilnius University . || 
|-id=143
| 180143 Gaberogers ||  || Gabe D. Rogers (born 1973) is an assistant group supervisor at the Johns Hopkins University Applied Physics Laboratory, who served as the Spacecraft Systems Engineer for the New Horizons mission to Pluto. || 
|}

180201–180300 

|-bgcolor=#f2f2f2
| colspan=4 align=center | 
|}

180301–180400 

|-id=367
| 180367 Vonfeldt ||  || Kevin Joseph VonFeldt (1983–2009), of Stafford, Texas, husband of Thanh, son of Randy and Mary and brother of Brian, was a licensed aircraft mechanic who loved family, baseball and motorcycles || 
|}

180401–180500 

|-bgcolor=#f2f2f2
| colspan=4 align=center | 
|}

180501–180600 

|-bgcolor=#f2f2f2
| colspan=4 align=center | 
|}

180601–180700 

|-id=643
| 180643 Cardoen ||  || Dany Cardoen (born 1949), French amateur astronomer and optician || 
|}

180701–180800 

|-id=739
| 180739 Barbet ||  || Alix Barbet (born 1940), French archaeologist and author, and Jean Barbet, French aeronautical engineer || 
|}

180801–180900 

|-id=824
| 180824 Kabos ||  || Gyula Kabos (1887–1941), Hungarian actor and comedian || 
|-id=855
| 180855 Debrarose ||  || Debra M. Rose (born 1959) is a Senior Program Manager for Research and Development at the Southwest Research Institute, and served as a Payload Instrument Sequencer for the New Horizons mission to Pluto. || 
|-id=857
| 180857 Hofigéza ||  || Géza Hofi (1936–2002), an actor and comedian, had a strong influence on Hungarian cabaret || 
|}

180901–181000 

|-id=940
| 180940 Bighornfire ||  || all firefighting personnel and organizations who tirelessly fought and suppressed the Bighorn Fire, a wildfire which scorched 120 000 acres of forest in the Santa Catalina Mountains, Arizona in summer 2020. Their heroic efforts kept thousands of people safe, and saved the astronomical facilities located there. || 
|}

References 

180001-181000